William Eldridge "Bucky" Brooks Jr. (born January 22, 1971) is a sportswriter and former professional American football player. He played for five National Football League (NFL) teams in a five-year career, primarily as a kick returner.

Brooks is in his sixth season as an analyst for NFL Network and NFL.com. He contributes weekly columns, as well as video features including "Scout’s Take" and "On the Beat" on NFL.com, and offers interactive analysis on the latest NFL topics and headlines with weekly live online chats.  He is currently the co-host on the podcast 'Move the Sticks', alongside Daniel Jeremiah. The two ex-scouts produce multiple podcasts each week during the NFL season and focus on topics such as NFL and NCAA game previews and reviews, and NFL Draft scouting. For the 2010 season, Brooks returned as an analyst for Thursday Night Football, NFL.com's in-game coverage of the Network's eight live, regular season game broadcasts. NFL.com/LIVE: Thursday Night Football presents a live show throughout the game including “live look ins” of the game, reports from the field and highlights.  He is also a frequent guest on NFL.com's Dave Dameshek Football Program podcast, appearing approximately once per week to discuss the NFL Draft and various listicles created for NFL.com.

References

External links
NFL.com player page

1971 births
Living people
Sportspeople from Raleigh, North Carolina
African-American players of American football
American football return specialists
Buffalo Bills players
Green Bay Packers players
Jacksonville Jaguars players
Kansas City Chiefs players
North Carolina Tar Heels football players
Oakland Raiders players
Players of American football from Raleigh, North Carolina
American sportswriters
National Football League announcers
Millbrook High School (NC) alumni
American podcasters